The Green Bay Dodgers were the final moniker of the minor league baseball teams located in Green Bay, Wisconsin, United States between 1891 and 1960. Green Bay teams played as members of the Wisconsin State League (1891), Wisconsin–Michigan League (1892), Wisconsin State League (1902, 1905–1907), Wisconsin–Illinois League (1908–1914), Wisconsin State League (1940–1942, 1946–1953 and Illinois–Indiana–Iowa League (1958–1960) .

Green Bay was an affiliate of the Philadelphia Phillies in 1946, Cleveland Indians from 1947 to 1953 and Los Angeles Dodgers from 1958 to 1960.

History
The final Green Bay minor league team originated as the Evansville Braves in 1946. The team was an affiliate of the Boston Braves/Milwaukee Braves from 1946–1957 and played in Evansville, Indiana. They won four league championships.

The team switched cities and affiliations for the 1958 season, moving to Green Bay and taking on the name of the Green Bay Bluejays that had been previously belonged to a different team that left town in 1953. Now affiliated with the Los Angeles Dodgers, the Bluejays won the league title in 1959. The name was changed to the Green Bay Dodgers for the 1960 season. The team folded after the season.

The earlier Green Bay Bluejays were members of the Wisconsin State League (1940–1942, 1946–1953) and were affiliated with the Cleveland Indians (1947–1953) and Philadelphia Phillies (1946). Previous Green Bay teams were the Green Bay Bays (1909–1914), Green Bay Tigers (1908), Green Bay Orphans (1907), Green Bay Colts (1905–1906), Green Bay (1902), Green Bay Bays (1892), and Green Bay (1891). They were members of the Wisconsin–Illinois League (1908–1914), Wisconsin State League (1902, 1905–1907), Wisconsin–Michigan League (1892) and the Wisconsin State League (1891).

The Ballparks
The Dodgers and Bluejays played at Joannes Stadium beginning in 1940. Located at Baird Street and Walnut Street, Joannes Stadium site is still used.

Notable players

 Phil Ortega (1960)
 Doug Camilli (1959)
 Willie Davis (1959) 2x MLB All-Star
 Tim Harkness (1959)
 Nate Oliver (1959)
 Pete Richert (1959) 2 x MLB All-Star
 Frank Howard (1958) 4× MLB All-Star;  2× AL Home Run Leader (1968, 1970); 1970 AL RBI Leader; 1960 NL Rookie of the Year
 Ed Rakow (1958)
 Pete Reiser (1958, MGR) 3× MLB All-Star; 1941 NL Batting Title; 2× NL Stolen Base Leader (1942, 1946)
 Earl Robinson (1958)
 Dick Brown (1953) 
 Russ Nixon (1953) MLB MGR
 Phil Seghi (1949–53, MGR) MLB Executive/Scout: Signed Pete Rose
 Billy Moran (1952) MLB All-Star
 Jim Delsing (1942)
 George Binks (1941)
 Andy Pafko (1941) 5 x MLB All-Star
 Felix Chouinard (1909–10, 1913)
 Fritz Mollwitz (1910–11, 1913)
 Fred Thomas (1913)
 Earl Smith (1911-1912) 
 Bert Cunningham (1892)
 Eddie Fusselback (1892)

References

External links
page on the history of the Illinois–Indiana–Iowa League
Baseball Reference

Defunct minor league baseball teams
Los Angeles Dodgers minor league affiliates
Philadelphia Phillies minor league affiliates
Cleveland Guardians minor league affiliates
Defunct baseball teams in Wisconsin
Wisconsin State League teams
Wisconsin-Illinois League teams
Wisconsin-Michigan League teams
Illinois-Indiana-Iowa League teams
1891 establishments in Wisconsin
Baseball teams established in 1891
1960 disestablishments in Wisconsin
Baseball teams disestablished in 1960